Lai Cheuk-cheuk (22 May 1905 – 15 May 1990), was a Chinese actress from Hong Kong. Lai is credited with over 180 films.

Early life 
On May 22, 1905, Lai was born in Hong Kong.

Career 
Lai started her acting career in Shanghai, China in 1932 when she joined the famed Lianhua Film Company, which was co-owned by her uncle Lai Man-Wai. In 1934, Lai started as an actress in Hong Kong films. Lai appeared in Breaking Waves, a 1934 Romance film directed by Moon Kwan Man-ching. Lai's last film was Joy to the World (aka Jacky Wong, King of Comedy), a 1980 Romantic Comedy film directed by Gam Yam. Lai is credited with over 180 films.

Filmography

Films

TV series

Personal life 
On May 15, 1990, Lai died in Hong Kong.

In popular culture
In the 1991 film Center Stage, Lai is portrayed by actress Maryanna Yip.

References

External links

 Lai Cheuk-cheuk at hkcinemagic.com
 Lai Cheuk-cheuk at senscritique.com

1905 births
1990 deaths
Hong Kong film actresses
20th-century Hong Kong actresses
Hong Kong television actresses
Chinese silent film actresses